Ilanga navakaensis is a species of sea snail, a marine gastropod mollusk in the family Solariellidae. 

It is only known as a fossil.

Distribution
Ilanga navakaensis is known only from the Pleistocene of Vanuatu, but Bruce Marshall (1993) recorded Recent material from New Caledonia as Kaiparathina cf. navakaensis

References

 Ladd, H. S. 1982. Cenozoic fossil mollusks from western Pacific Islands; Gastropods (Eulimidae and Volutidae through Terebridae). United States Geological Survey Professional Paper 1171:iv + 1-100, 41 pls
 Marshall B.A. (1993) A review of the genus Kaiparathina Laws, 1941 (Mollusca: Gastropoda: Trochoidea). The Veliger 36: 185-198

External links
 To World Register of Marine Species
 Vilvens C. & Williams S.T. (2020). New species of Ilanga (Gastropoda: Trochoidea: Solariellidae) from the Indo-West Pacific. Zootaxa. 4732(2): 201-257

navakaensis
Gastropods described in 1982